USS Cleveland  (LCS-31) will be a  littoral combat ship of the United States Navy. She will be the fourth commissioned ship in naval service named after Cleveland, the second-largest city in Ohio.

Design 
In 2002, the US Navy initiated a program to develop the first of a fleet of littoral combat ships. The Navy initially ordered two monohull ships from Lockheed Martin, which became known as the Freedom-class littoral combat ships after the first ship of the class, . Odd-numbered US Navy littoral combat ships are built using the Freedom-class monohull design, while even-numbered ships are based on a competing design, the trimaran hull  from General Dynamics. The initial order of littoral combat ships involved a total of four ships, including two of the Freedom-class design. Cleveland will be the sixteenth Freedom-class littoral combat ship to be built.

Construction and Career 
Marinette Marine was awarded the contract to build the ship on 15 January 2019.

References

 
 

Cleveland
Freedom-class littoral combat ships
Lockheed Martin